The Stroe Church is a Romanian Orthodox church located at 13 Duiliu Zamfirescu Street in Focșani, Romania. It is dedicated to Saint Nicholas.

The church was built in 1839. It is listed as a historic monument by Romania's Ministry of Culture and Religious Affairs.

Notes

Religious buildings and structures in Focșani
Historic monuments in Vrancea County
Romanian Orthodox churches in Vrancea County
Churches completed in 1839